The 1881 Kentucky Derby was the 7th running of the Kentucky Derby. The race took place on May 17, 1881.

Full results

Payout

The winner received a purse of $4,410.
Second place received $200.

References

1881
Kentucky Derby
Derby
May 1881 sports events